Ardineh (also Romanized as Ārdīneh) is a village in Abali Rural District, Rudehen District, Damavand County, Tehran Province, Iran. At the 2006 census, its population was 189, in 53 families.

References 

Populated places in Damavand County